These hits topped the Dutch Top 40 in 1970.

See also
1970 in music

References

1970 in the Netherlands
1970 record charts
1970